Tha Sae is a district (amphoe) in the northwestern part of Chumphon province, southern Thailand.

History
Mueang Tha Sae was under Mueang Chumphon, with its governor having the rank phra. King Chulalongkorn downgraded Mueang Tha Sae to a district of Chumphon Province. In 1920 the government downgraded Tha Sae to a minor district (king amphoe) of Pathio district. It was officially upgraded to a full district again in 1940.

The district name originates from the public canal pier (in Thai: tha), where plenty of catechu trees (Callerya atropurpurea) grow.

Geography
Neighboring districts are (from the north clockwise) Bang Saphan Noi of Prachuap Khiri Khan province, Pathio and Mueang Chumphon of Chumphon Province, and Kra Buri of Ranong province. To the west is the Tanintharyi Division of Myanmar.

The important water resources are the Tha Sae and Rap Ro Rivers.

Administration
The district is divided into 10 sub-districts (tambons), which are further subdivided into 116 villages (mubans). Tha Sae is a township (thesaban tambon) covering parts of the tambon Tha Sea. Noen Sam Thi covers further parts of tambon Tha Sae. There are a further 10 tambon administrative organizations (TAO).

Economy
The coffee-growing valley of Ban Panwal in the district includes 178,283 rai of robusta coffee plantations. It produces more than 24 million tonnes a year. Chumphon Province contributes 60 percent of Thailand's total coffee production, much of it from here. Local brands include Thamsing, ST Chumphon, and Khao Tha-Lu Chumporn.

References

External links
amphoe.com

Districts of Chumphon province